Shahed Chowdhury (2 March 1966 – 17 March 2019) was a Bangladeshi film director. He directed many Dhallywood movies.

Biography
Chowdhury was born on 2 March 1966 in the village of Koya of Kumarkhali Upazila of Kushtia District. His debut direction was Khol Nayika which was released in 2002. This film is selected for preservation in Bangladesh Film Archive. He also directed films like Tough Operation and Tension. These films are also selected for preservation in Bangladesh Film Archive. Aral was his last direction. This film was released in 2016.

Chowdhury died on 17 March 2019 at the age of 53.

Selected filmography
 Khol Nayika
 Tough Operation
 High Risk
 Tension
 Valo Hote Chai
 Aral

References

2019 deaths
Bangladeshi film directors
1966 births
People from Kushtia District